Bulbophyllum minutissimum, commonly known as the red bead orchid or grain-of-wheat orchid, is a species of epiphytic or lithophytic orchid with small, flattened, reddish or green pseudobulbs, scale-like leaves and small whitish to reddish flowers with broad dar red stripes. It grows on trees and rocks, mostly in swamps and near streams in eastern Australia.

Description
The pseudobulbs contain stomata on their inner surface, which minimizes surface area and the loss of water by transpiration. The flowers are whitish to reddish with broad dark red stripes and have a pimply or hairy ovary. Flowering occurs from October to November.

Taxonomy and naming
The red bead orchid was first formally described in 1865 by Ferdinand von Mueller who gave it the name Dendrobium minutissimum and published the description in Fragmenta phytographiae Australiae, but in 1878 he changed the name to Bulbophyllum minutissimum. The specific epithet (minutissimum) is the superlative form of the Latin word minutus meaning "little" or "small", hence "smallest".

Distribution and habitat
Bulbophyllum minutissimum grows on trees and rocks in wet places, including swamps, stream banks and mangroves. It occurs between the Blackdown Tableland in Queensland and Milton in New South Wales.

References 

minutissimum
Orchids of New South Wales
Orchids of Queensland
Endemic orchids of Australia
Epiphytic orchids
Plants described in 1865
Taxa named by Ferdinand von Mueller